Dame Dreaming, also known as Dame Dreaming with Bill Doggett, is an album by American organist Bill Doggett released by the King label in 1957.

Critical reception

AllMusic reviewer Myles Boisen stated "This was one of Bill Doggett's smooth 'n' easy recordings ... don't expect anything that will rattle the ice cubes in your martini".

Track listing
 "Sweet Lorraine" (Cliff Burwell, Mitchell Parish) – 2:23
 "Diane" (Ernö Rapée, Lew Pollack) – 2:48
 "Dinah" (Harry Akst, Sam M. Lewis, Joe Young) – 2:45
 "Ramona" (L. Wolfe Gilbert, Mabel Wayne) – 2:17
 "Cherry" (Don Redman, Ray Gilbert) – 3:04
 "Cynthia" (Jack Owens, Earl Gish, Billy White) – 2:35
 "Jeannine" (Nathaniel Shilkret, Gilbert) – 2:23
 "Tangerine" (Victor Schertzinger, Johnny Mercer) – 2:54
 "Nancy" (Jimmy Van Heusen, Phil Silvers) – 2:47
 "Estrellita" (Manuel Ponce, Frank La Forge) – 2:47
 "Laura" (David Raksin, Johnny Mercer) – 2:54
 "Marcheta" (Victor Schertzinger) – 2:01

Personnel
Bill Doggett – organ
Clifford Scott – tenor saxophone, alto saxophone, flute (tracks 2-12)
Percy France – tenor saxophone (track 1)
Billy Butler (tracks 2-12), Jerry Lane (track 1) – guitar
Edwyn Conley (tracks 2-12), Clarence Mack (track 1) - bass
Shep Shepherd – drums

References 

King Records (United States) albums
Bill Doggett albums
1957 albums